Jain monasticism refers to the order of monks and nuns in the Jain community and can be divided into two major denominations: the Digambara and the Śvētāmbara. The monastic practices of the two major sects vary greatly, but the major principles of both are identical. Five mahāvratas (Great Vows), from Mahavira's teachings, are followed by all Jain ascetics. Historians believe that a united Jain sangha (community) existed before 367 BCE, about 160 years after the moksha (liberation) of Mahavira. The community then gradually divided into the major denominations.

Terminology
Digambaras use the word  for male monastics and aryika for female monastics. Digambara monks are also called nirgrantha (without bonds).  Śvētāmbaras use the word sadhvis for female monastics.

History 
Mahavira had 11 chief disciples, Indrabhuti Gautama being the most senior. Each chief disciple was made responsible for 250 to 500 monks. The Jain sangha (community) was led and administered by an organised system consisting of acharyas (leaders), upadhyayas (teachers), sthaviras (motivators of self-discipline), pravartakas (preachers) and ganis (leader of smaller groups of monks). Other titles included panyasa (canonical text experts), mahattara (female leader) and pravartini (female preacher).

The leadership of Jain order passed from Mahavira to Indrabhuti, who was succeeded by Sudharma (607–506 BCE). After 12 years, it was further passed on to Jambu (543–449 BCE), Prabhava (443–338 BCE) and Shayyambhava (377–315 BCE).

Historians believe that a united Jain community existed before 367 BCE, about 160 years after the moksha (liberation) of Mahavira. The community then gradually divided into two denominations: the Digambara and the Śvētāmbara. Acharya Kundakunda is the most revered acharya (preceptor) of the Duḥṣamā period of the present avasarpiṇī (descending) era. The Kalpa Sūtra describes Mahavira's asceticism in detail; from it, most of the ascetic practices (including the restraints and regulations) are derived:

Initiation 
A Śvētāmbara initiation involves a procession in which the initiate symbolically disposes of his material wealth and makes donations. This is followed (or preceded) by another ritual in which the initiate receives an ogho (a small broom made of wool) from their mentor as a symbol of welcome into the monastic order. The initiate then puts on monastic clothing and pluck out hairs by hand. Further rituals formally initiate them into the monastic order. The Śvētāmbara Terapanth And  Sthanakwasi sect requests written permission from a person's parents before initiating them into the ascetic order.

Rules of conduct

The earliest known texts often ask for ascetics to be in complete solitude, identifying the isolation of soul and non-soul. However, soon after Mahavira's nirvana ascetics organized themselves into groups. A few examples of ascetics living in complete solitude are found in the Digambara sect. Jain ascetics are detached from social and worldly activities; all activities are aimed at self-purification for self-realization. They follow established guidelines for daily worship and austerity.

The monk's daily routine is broadly structured by three ideological formulae: the five great vows (mahavrata), the eight matrices of doctrine (pravacana-matrka), and the six obligatory actions (avasyaka). The first two are restrictions, and the third is positively framed in what the monk is encouraged to do daily. Ascetics do not have a home or possessions. They choose austerity, avoid services such as telephones and electricity. Monks engage in activities such as meditation, seeking knowledge and acquiring self-discipline. Jain monks and advanced laypeople avoid eating after sunset, observing a vow of ratri-bhojana-tyaga-vrata. Digambara monks observe a stricter vow by eating only once a day.

The Yati of the Śvētāmbara sect and the Bhattaraka of the Digambara Terapanth do not wander; they usually live in temples and perform daily rituals. The monks rise before dawn, most around 5:00 a.m. but some as early as 2:00 a.m.

Five mahāvratas (Great Vows), from Mahavira's teachings, are followed by all Jain ascetics. Although Jain householders are also required to observe them, ascetics are bound more strictly.

Ranks
Monks and nuns from the Digambara traditions are assigned to ranks:

In the Digambara tradition, an ascetic rises from kshullak (one who uses two pieces of cloth) through Ailak (uses one piece of cloth) to muni (or sadhu). Over time a number of designations were mentioned in shastras, such as gani, pannyas and pravartak. The Śvētāmbara Terapanth sect has a new rank of junior monks, samana.

Attire and possessions

Observing complete abstinence, male Digambara monks wear no clothing. Aryikas wear plain, seamless white saris. All Digambara monks and nuns traditionally carry only three things: a mor-pichhi (peacock-feather whisk), a kamandalu (water pot) and shastras (scriptures).

Śvētāmbara monastics wear white, seamless clothing.

Chaturmas

Chaturmas is the four-month monsoon period during which ascetics stay in one place to reduce the risk of accidentally killing insects and other small forms of life which thrive during the rains. This period is suitable for sravakas to renew their faith by listening to teachings of the dharma, meditation and vartas (acts of self-control).

During Chaturmas, a few sadhu of each group give a daily pravacana or vyakhyana (sermon) attended mostly by shravaka and shravikas (Jain followers). During their eight months of travel, the sadhus give sermons whenever requested (most often when they arrive in a new village or town in their travels).

Digambara monks 

Digambara monks follow 28 vratas (vows): five mahāvratas (Great Vows); five samitis (regulations); the five-fold control of the senses (pañcendriya nirodha); six Şadāvaśyakas (essential duties), and seven niyamas (restrictions).

See also
 List of Jain ascetics
 Jain schools and branches

References

Citations

Sources

External links

List of All Digamber Jain Monks With detailed description
Photo documentary of the Jain monks

 
Asceticism
Monasticism
Monasticism
Titles and occupations in Hinduism